Gulbrand is a Norwegian masculine given name. It is derived from the Old Norse Guðbrandr meaning "god's sword", from the elements guð ("god") and brandr ("sword"). It is a variant of the name Gudbrand.

People bearing the name Gulbrand include:

Gulbrand Alhaug (born 1942), Norwegian onomastician and linguistics professor 
Gulbrand Hagen (1865–1919), Norwegian-born American was an American newspaper editor, writer and photographer
Gulbrand Jensen (1885–), Norwegian judge
Gulbrand Lunde (1901–1942), Norwegian politician and Nazi collaborator
Gudbrand Østbye (1885–1972), Norwegian Army officer and historian
Gulbrand Eriksen Tandberg (1775–1848), Norwegian politician

References

Norwegian masculine given names